Astathes nitens is a species of beetle in the family Cerambycidae. It was described by Johan Christian Fabricius in 1801. It is known from Malaysia, Java, Sumatra and Thailand.

Varieties
 Astathes nitens var. apicalis Thomson, 1865
 Astathes nitens var. flavipennis Breuning, 1956
 Astathes nitens var. flavipes Breuning, 1956
 Astathes nitens var. nigroapicalis Breuning, 1956
 Astathes nitens var. thomsoni Breuning, 1956
 Astathes nitens var. vagemaculata Breuning, 1960

References

N
Beetles described in 1801